Constitution of 1956 may refer to:

Egyptian Constitution of 1956
Constitution of Pakistan of 1956
Constitution of Guatemala of 1956